Alan Gregory Sayers is an entrepreneur, author and a New Zealand politician who is an Auckland Councillor.

Early life
The son of journalist and athlete Alan Sayers, Sayers attended Auckland Grammar School, where he was a school prefect and the winner of the Burroughs Trophy (Dux Ludorum). Sayers attended the University of Auckland, where he studied Chemistry and was awarded a Bachelor of Science degree. He holds a New Zealand Institute of Management diploma in Management.

Before entering politics, Sayers was chairman of several companies, including Zorb Limited and Kiwa Digital Limited. He co-owned the financial software development firm Real Nz Software (Real Software Support Limited).

Political career

 

Sayers was elected to the Hibiscus and Bays Local Board in 2010.

At the 2013 Auckland elections, Sayers was elected to both the Rodney Local Board and the Hibiscus and Bays Local Board.

At the 2016 Auckland elections, Sayers was elected to the Auckland Council, defeating incumbent Penny Webster in an "upset". In his maiden speech he "said Auckland Council had to restore trust with his ward" and the "Council must live within its financial means".

In 2019 Sayers wrote a book titled “How to Fix Auckland’s Housing Crisis – 4 Bold Proven Solutions”.

At the 2019 Auckland elections, Sayers was re-elected to the Auckland Council, becoming the first Rodney Ward councillor since Auckland Council's formation in 2010 to be elected unopposed.

At the 2022 Auckland elections, in a “landslide victory” Sayers was re-elected to the Auckland Council as the Rodney Ward councillor in 2022.

References

Living people
Auckland Councillors
Year of birth missing (living people)